Methylorubrum populi is an aerobic, pink-pigmented, facultatively methylotrophic, methane-utilizing bacterium isolated from poplar trees (Populus deltoides, hence its name). Its type strain is BJ001T (=ATCC BAA-705T =NCIMB 13946T).

References

Further reading

External links
Methylorubrum LPSN

Hyphomicrobiales
Bacteria described in 2004